Üllar "Jörpa" Jörberg (9 June 1941 – 26 December 2018) was an Estonian singer.

Biography 
In school, he sang in a choir as well as an all-male vocal quartet. He graduated from Viljandi Secondary School No. 2 in 1961. Prior to serving in the Soviet Army, he studied physical education at the University of Tartu.

He started singing professionally in 1967, playing solo gigs at the Kaseke restaurant in Tartu. He also later performed with the band Fix.

He released dozens of records and over 600 songs over the span of his career; predominantly dance music. Many of his hits were Estonian-language translations of popular songs in other languages, but he did have some well-known originals as well. According to Kroonika, his best-known songs include Mereranna tuul (an Estonian-language cover of “Agadoo”) and Kutse tantsule (an Estonian-language cover of "I Can Make You Feel Like").

In 2014, TV3 made a documentary about him named A Story about the Real Jörberg, directed by Antti Oolo.

In 2017, Jörberg, along with his wife Ester Jörberg and fellow musician Onu Bella, hosted the program "Great Love of the South Sea" on Radio 2. Also that year, Jörberg announced his retirement; his last major performances were at the 2018  and  festivals.

Üllar Jörberg died as a result of a sudden medical condition on 26 December 2018. He was survived by his wife Ester and son Sven.

Discography 
In the below list, the publisher follows the name of the album. Some albums contain guest appearances by other artists:

 1986 "Üllar Jörberg", Meloodia
 1992 "The away places: the best of Üllar Jörberg 1992", Üllar Jörberg
 1992 "Tänan sind", Helijälg
 1992 "Wanderer’s love songs", Stellaris
 1992 "Saarenmaan valssi: Sävellahja Virosta", Üllar Jörberg and Voldemar Kuslap
 1995 "Mexico kuu", Best Hits
 1998 "Ununenud meloodiad", Cajun Music
 1993 "Meri ja kitarr", Heldur Jõgioja
 1996 "Suur ahv", Theka
 1997 "Kutse people", Hitivabrik
 2000 "Millal märkad mind?", HelMus
 2000 "Parimad 1", Records 2000
 2000 "Sävellahja Virosta: Tulkaa tanssimaan: Saarenmaan valssi", LeHelMus
 2000 "Kõik muutub…", LeHelMus
 2000 "Varjud alleel", Records 2000
 2001 "Parimad 2", Records 2000
 2002 "Tantsin kogu elu", Records 2000
 2002 "Üllari kuldsed hitid: Õnnesoov", LeHelMus
 2004 "Õnnelootus", TopTen
 2004 "Very Best of Üllar Jörberg", Records 2000
 2006 "Kord tuleb aeg...", Records 2000
 2006 "Parimad III", Eurorecords
 2008 "Flamenco Rio öös", LeHelMus
 2008 "Viva Šampanja", Records 2000
 2009 "Üllar Jörberg", Estonian Artist Agency
 2009 "Elujõe kaldad" LeHelMus
 2009 "Kordumatu" LeHelMus
 2013 "Kaunimad armastuslaulud" Aenigma OÜ
 2014 "Parimad 3" Records 2000
 2016 "Kuld [3CD]" Records 2000

Notes

References 

1941 births
2018 deaths
20th-century Estonian male singers
21st-century Estonian male singers
Estonian pop singers
University of Tartu alumni
Singers from Tallinn